Mathew "Mat" Belcher,  (born 20 September 1982) is an Australian sailor and a two-time Olympic gold medalist in the 470 dinghy, who currently competes with crew Will Ryan. In 2011, following World Championship and World Cup success, he and Malcolm Page were shortlisted by the International Sailing Federation for the ISAF World Sailor of the Year Awards. Belcher was selected as the Australian flag bearer for the closing ceremony of the 2020 Summer Olympics after winning a second gold medal and third successive medal in the 470 class.

Belcher is regarded as the most successful Australian Olympic sailor in history with two gold and one silver medal, adding to his 10 world titles.

Earlier years 
Mathew grew up on the Gold Coast, Queensland and therefore was always surrounded by water. He was only six years old when he started sailing in a 10-year-old Sabot (dinghy) tied to the back of his parents' boat.

In 1989 at the age of seven Mathew competed in his first race at the Southport Yacht Club.

Sailing career
Having won the 420 World Championship in 2000, the feeder class to the 470, while still conducting his school at The Southport School on the Gold Coast, Belcher was given the distinction of carrying the Olympic flag during the closing ceremony of the 2000 Summer Olympics. At that point, he decided to become an Olympian. Coach Victor Kovalenko invited him onto the Australian 470 sailing squad where he became the tuning partner for Nathan Wilmot and Page. As a helmsman, Belcher rose to the #1 ISAF ranking in 2007 but did not qualify for the 2008 Olympics when Wilmot and Page won the 470 World Championship and then went on to represent Australia at the 2008 Summer Olympics in Beijing.

Olympic Games
Together with 2008 Olympic gold medalist Malcolm Page, Belcher won the gold medal at the 2012 Summer Olympics in London in the 470 class. Together with Will Ryan, Belcher was runner up in the 2016 Rio Olympics, winning the silver medal in the 470 class. In the 2020 Tokyo Olympics, Belcher and Ryan won the gold medal in the 470 class.

In October 2022 Belcher announced his retirement from Olympic sailing and will serve as CEO of Zhik, a sailing clothing company.

Recognition
2012 – Australian Sailing Awards – Male Sailor of the Year (with Malcolm Page)

2013 – Australian Sailing Awards – Male Sailor of the Year (with Will Ryan)

2013 – Australian Institute of Sport Awards – Team of the Year (with Will Ryan)

2014 – Australian Sailing Awards – Male Sailor of the Year (with Will Ryan)

2015 – Australian Sailing Awards – Male Sailor of the Year (with Will Ryan)

2019 – Australian Sailing Awards – Male Sailor of the Year (with Will Ryan)

2019 – Australian Institute of Sport Awards – Team of the Year (with Will Ryan) 

2021 – Australian Sailing Awards – Male Sailor of the Year (with Will Ryan)

2022 – Australian Sailing Hall of Fame

References

External links
  
 
 
 
 

1982 births
Living people
Australian male sailors (sport)
Sailors at the 2012 Summer Olympics – 470
Sailors at the 2016 Summer Olympics – 470
Sailors at the 2020 Summer Olympics – 470
Olympic sailors of Australia
Olympic medalists in sailing
Olympic gold medalists for Australia
Olympic silver medalists for Australia
Medalists at the 2012 Summer Olympics
Medalists at the 2016 Summer Olympics
Medalists at the 2020 Summer Olympics
ISAF World Sailor of the Year (male)
420 class world champions
470 class world champions
Etchells class world champions
World champions in sailing for Australia
Recipients of the Medal of the Order of Australia
21st-century Australian people